The 2015–16 Chicago State Cougars women's basketball team represented Chicago State University during the 2015–16 college basketball season. The Cougars, led by thirteenth year head coach Angela Jackson, played their home games at the Emil and Patricia Jones Convocation Center as members of the Western Athletic Conference. They finished the season 4–25, 2–12 in WAC play to finish in last place. They lost in the quarterfinals of the WAC women's tournament to Texas–Rio Grande Valley.

Roster

Schedule and results
Source

|-
!colspan=9 style="background:#28372F; color:#FFFFFF;"| Non-conference regular season

|-
!colspan=9 style="background:#28372F; color:#FFFFFF;"| WAC regular season

|-
!colspan=9 style="background:#28372F; color:#FFFFFF;"| WAC Women's Tournament

See also
2015–16 Chicago State Cougars men's basketball team

References

Chicago State Cougars women's basketball seasons
Chicago State